Bristol City Women's Football Club is a women's association football team from the city of Bristol. Formed in 1998 as Bristol Rovers W.F.C., they were renamed Bristol Academy W.F.C. in 2005 following increased involvement of the Bristol Academy of Sport, based at Filton College (now part of South Gloucestershire and Stroud College). A second change of name, this time to Bristol City was approved by the FA Women's Football Board in time for the 2016 WSL season. They play their home games at the Robins High Performance Centre.  Bristol City Women won promotion to the FA Women's Super League (WSL), the highest level of the women's game in England in 2016 and stayed there for five seasons before being relegated to the FA Women's Championship in 2021.

History

Early Years
The team was founded in 1998, following a merger between the Bristol Rovers girls' teams and Welsh side Cable-Tel L.F.C.. This merger came about as Bristol Rovers only had girls teams up to the under 16 age group level, so when girls reached the age of 16 they were forced to leave the club. The merger with Cable-Tel meant that Bristol Rovers had a senior squad, and more importantly it gave them a place in the South West Combination league, only two levels below the top flight of women's football in England. This new merged team took the name Bristol Rovers W.F.C. and played their home games at The Beeches, the training ground and administrative offices of Bristol Rovers, located in Brislington.

The team, like their male counterparts at Bristol Rovers, were somewhat nomadic in their early days, having played home matches at The Beeches, Lodge Road (home of Yate Town), Cossham Street (Mangotsfield United), the Memorial Stadium (Bristol Rovers), Fry's Sports Ground in Keynsham, The Lawns (Cribbs F.C.), The Hand Stadium (Clevedon Town), Lakeview (Bishop Sutton), and Oaklands Park (Almondsbury Town). They finally acquired their own purpose-built home ground, Stoke Gifford Stadium, on land owned by Filton College (now South Gloucestershire and Stroud College) in time for the inaugural FA WSL season in 2011. Since then, all of their home games were  played there up until the end of the 2019-20 season, with the exception of UEFA Women's Champions League matches, which have been held at Ashton Gate.

The name of the club was changed to Bristol Academy at the beginning of the 2005–06 season to reflect the increased involvement of the Bristol Academy of Sport with the club. The team continued to play in the blue and white quarters of Bristol Rovers however, and also retained the nickname The Gas Girls, an acknowledgement of Rovers' unofficial nickname of The Gas. Bristol Rovers, now in the bottom division of The Football League, found themselves unable to continue financing a women's team in 2006 and withdrew funding. Bristol Academy of Sport agreed to bankroll the team for 12 months, but there were serious doubts during the 2006–07 season that the club would survive beyond the summer.

In summer 2009 the club had a funding crisis. Manager Gary Green was sacked, Corinne Yorston left for Arsenal, Stef Curtis for Chelsea and Gwennan Harries for Everton. Without their star players the team finished bottom of the table in 2009–10.

The club were one of eight founding teams in the FA WSL in April 2011, when they moved into a brand new stadium at South Gloucestershire and Stroud College's Stoke Gifford Campus.

In 2013 the club signed a sponsorship agreement with Bristol City FC and changed their home kit from blue to red, and three years later the club was renamed Bristol City Women's Football Club.

In July 2018, the club named Tanya Oxtoby its new manager, moving into the position from being an assistant with Birmingham City W.F.C.

League history

It took just two seasons to gain promotion to the FA Women's Premier League Southern Division, when the club won the South West Combination in the 2000–01 season under the management of Dave Bell. After this Dave Bell left the club to join the academy set-up at Manchester United, and was replaced by Tony Ricketts.

Tony Ricketts also achieved league success, with the team winning the Southern Division in the 2002–03 season and earning promotion to the FA Women's Premier League National Division. The first season in the top-flight was a struggle, with the team narrowly avoiding relegation. However Bristol Academy established themselves in the National Division with two fifth-place finishes over the next two seasons.

In the 2006–2007 season, they began as top contenders for the title, having reached the top spot in November (though defending champions Arsenal L.F.C. kept postponing matches due to European Cup, League Cup and FA Cup commitments, which might have been a factor in Bristol's recent success). As Arsenal restarted its League matches, however, Bristol Academy slipped, hovering between the 4th and 8th places.

Bristol City Women finished 2nd in FA WSL 2 for the 2016 season and won promotion to FA WSL 1 for their 2017 campaign.

They were relegated in the 2020/21 to the FA Women's Championship where they finished 3rd in their first season back in the second tier.

Cup history

In the short history of the team they have reached the semi-final of the FA Women's Cup five times. The first was in the 2000–01 season when they were still playing their league football in the South West Combination, playing in front of a club record crowd of over 3000 at the Memorial Stadium against Arsenal L.F.C. The match ended in a 3–0 defeat. Three more unsuccessful semi-final matches were to follow in this competition, against Fulham L.F.C. in 2002–03, Charlton Athletic L.F.C. in the 2004–05 season and Arsenal again providing the opposition in 2006–07.

In 2011 the club reached the final of the FA Cup after a 3–0 semi-final win over Liverpool. Bristol were beaten 2–0 by Arsenal in the final, before 13,885 fans at the Ricoh Arena in Coventry. In 2013 the club reached its second FA Cup final after a 2–0 semi-final win over Lincoln Ladies. Bristol were again beaten by Arsenal 3–0 in the final at the Keepmoat Stadium in Doncaster.

The team dominated the Gloucestershire FA Women's Challenge Cup in their early days, winning the trophy eight times in their first nine seasons. The only failure to win the competition came in the 2003–04 season when they were beaten in the final by the original Bristol City W.F.C., their first ever defeat to their cross-city rivals. Following the 2006–07 win the first team stopped competing in the tournament, although their junior teams continued taking part.

They did manage to reach the final of the Continental Tyres League Cup Final in the 2020-21 season where they unfortunately suffered defeat against Chelsea FC.

UEFA competitions
For a detailed international record see English women's football clubs in international competitions

Because of the new WSL, England's UEFA Women's Champions League places were allocated to the FA Cup finalists as a one time exception. Thus Bristol won a place in the 2011–12 UEFA Women's Champions League round of 32. They started in the round of 32 and were drawn against Russian side Energiya Voronezh and drew their home game 1–1 but lost the return leg in Russia 2–4 and didn't advance.

Season by season

League cup column shows results in the FA Women's Premier League Cup (2001–2010) and the FA WSL Cup (2011–present)
There was no WSL Cup tournament during the 2017 WSL Spring Series

Stadium

After having played at a number of different grounds, the team finally got their own home in 2011 when they moved into the newly built Stoke Gifford Stadium. It was the first stadium in the UK to be developed specifically for a women's football team, and is built on South Gloucestershire and Stroud College's WISE campus. They stayed here until the end of the 2019-20 season. After this league requirements saw a move to Twerton Park and a groundshare with Bath City FC. The robins only stayed here for one season before they relocated to the Robins High Performance Centre for the start 2021-22 season. Multiple games have also been played at Ashton Gate stadium.

The club record attendance came in April 2022 when 5,752 spectators watched Bristol City against Liverpool in the FA Women's Championship at Ashton Gate. This is also a record attendance for. game in the second tier of English Women's football.

Team honours

FA Women's Premier League Southern Division: 1
 2002–03
South West Combination Women's Football League: 1
 2000–01
Gloucestershire FA Women's Challenge Cup: 8
 1998–99, 1999–2000, 2000–01, 2001–02, 2002–03, 2004–05, 2005–06, 2006–07

Club records 

Highest league finish position: 2nd in Women's Super League 2013 as Bristol Academy W.F.C

Lowest league position: 3rd in FA Womens Championship 2021/22

Most points in a season - 39 (2016 WSL 2)

Lowest points in a season - 12 (2020/21 Women's Super League)

Most league wins in a season - 12 (2016 WSL 2)

Fewest league wins in a season - 2 (2019/20 Women's Super League)

Most league defeats in a season - 14 (2020/21 Women's Super League)

Fewest league defeats in a season - 3 (2016 WSL 2)

Most league draws in a season - 6 (2020/21 Women's Super League)

Fewest league draws in a season - 1 (2017/18 Women's Super League)

Most league goals scored in a season -  43 (2021/22 FA Womens Championship)

Fewest league goals scored in a season - 9 (2019/20 Women's Super League) *

Most league goals conceded in a season - 72 (2020/21 Women's Super League)

Fewest league goals conceded in a season - 16 (2016 WSL 2)

Biggest win - 7-1 Vs Queens Park Rangers WFC, SSE Women's FA Cup, February 14th 2016

Biggest defeat - Arsenal Women 11–1 Bristol City Women - December 1st 2019

Highest scoring match - Arsenal Women 11–1 Bristol City Women - December 1st 2019

Highest transfer fee paid - 

Highest transfer fee received -  £25,000 Ebony Salmon to Racing Louisville FC (January 2021)

Most goals in a season by a player - Abi Harrison - 21 (2021/22 FA Womens Championship)

Youngest player - 16 years and 44 days - Lauren Hemp (Vs Watford F.C. Women, WSL 2, 10 September 2016)

Oldest player - 34 years and 266 days - Rachel Furness (Vs Durham W.F.C.., FA Womens Championship, 11 March 2023)

Fastest goal - Chloe Bull - 38 seconds (Vs Crystal Palace F.C. (Women), FA Womens Championship, 5 February 2022)

Most goals by a player in a match - 2 - Rosella Ayane (Vs Yeovil Town Ladies, March 23rd 2016)

Youngest goalscorer - 16 years and 44 days - Lauren Hemp (Vs Watford F.C. Women, WSL 2, 10 September 2016)

Oldest goalscorer - 29 years and 237 days Loren Dykes (Vs Yeovil Town Ladies, Women's Super League, 30 September 2017)

Most league matches won in a row - 5 - February 6th 2022 to March 13th 2022

Most league matches without losing - 8 - December 5th 2022 -

Most league matches lost in a row - 6 - January 14th 2018 to April 18th 2022

Most league matches without winning - 11 - September 6th 2020 t0 January 30th 2021

Most league matches without conceding - 4 - March 26th 2016 to May 1st 2016

Highest attendance - 5,732 Vs Liverpool F.C. Women - 3 April 2022, Ashton Gate Stadium

Lowest attendance - 287 Vs Southampton F.C. Women - 11 December 2022

Highest average attendance - 1,215 (2019/20 Women's Super League)

Most appearances: 

 Grace McCatty - 141
 Loren Dykes - 105
 Jasmine Matthews & Frankie Brown - 100
 Abi Harrison - 96
 Sophie Baggaley - 90
 Flo Allen (footballer) -  87
 Carla Humphrey - 86
 Angharad James (footballer) - 74
 Corinne Yorston - 73
 Gemma Evans (footballer) - 71

All time top goal-scorers:

 Abi Harrison - 36
 Natalia Pablos - 22
 Laura del Río - 20
 Ebony Salmon - 18
 Millie Farrow & Natasha Harding - 14
 Lucy Graham - 12
 Claire Emslie, Lauren Hemp & Shania Hayles - 11
 Corinne Yorston - 10
 Jess Fishlock/ Jemma Rose/Chloe Bull - 9
Most Clean sheets

 Sophie Baggaley - 27
 Fran Bentley - 21
 Caitlin Leach - 9

Current squad

Club Staff

Former players 
For details of former players, see :Category:Bristol City W.F.C. players.

See also

 List of women's association football clubs in England and Wales
 Women's football in England
 List of women's association football clubs

References

External links

 Bristol City club website

 
Association football clubs established in 1998
Women's football clubs in England
Football clubs in Bristol
Bristol City F.C.
South Gloucestershire and Stroud College
1998 establishments in England
FA WSL 1 teams
Women's Championship (England) teams
FA Women's National League teams